Under the Thousand Lanterns is a 1952 French-West German crime film directed by Erich Engel and starring Michel Auclair, Gisela Trowe, and Hanna Rucker. It was entered into the 1952 Cannes Film Festival. It was made by Real Film at the Wandsbek Studios in Hamburg and on location in the city. The film's sets were designed by Albrecht Becker and Herbert Kirchhoff.

Cast

References

Bibliography

External links

1952 films
West German films
1950s German-language films
1952 crime films
German crime films
French crime films
French black-and-white films
Films directed by Erich Engel
Films shot in Hamburg
Real Film films
Films shot at Wandsbek Studios
German black-and-white films
1950s German films
1950s French films